Guillaume Rufin won the title, defeating Javier Martí 6–2, 6–3 in the final.

Seeds

Draw

Finals

Top half

Bottom half

References
 Main Draw
 Qualifying Draw

Copa Agco Cordoba - Singles
2012 Singles